Lamberto Leonardi (8 August 1939 – 22 February 2021) was an Italian professional football coach and player.

External links
Profile at Enciclopedia del Calcio

1939 births
2021 deaths
Italian footballers
Association football midfielders
Serie A players
Serie B players
A.S. Roma players
Cosenza Calcio 1914 players
A.C. Prato players
Modena F.C. players
S.S.D. Varese Calcio players
Juventus F.C. players
Atalanta B.C. players
Italian football managers
S.S. Ischia Isolaverde managers
Benevento Calcio managers